Asha Jyoti is a 1984 Hindi film starring Rajesh Khanna, Rekha, Reena Roy in lead roles. The film was directed by Dasari Narayana Rao, who had also directed Aaj Ka M.L.A. Ram Avtar with Khanna in the lead role and music was given by Laxmikant-Pyarelal. The film is remake of Telugu Movie Srivari Muchatlu (1981). The film grossed 5.75 crores at the box office in 1984 and was a commercial success. It received three stars in the Bollywood guide Collections.

Plot
Ramesh Chander (Om Shivpuri), a businessman, asks his son Deepak (Rajesh Khanna), a musician, if he would marry his childhood friend Asha (Rekha), but Deepak keeps declining this idea. Deepak falls in love with one of his fans named Jyoti (Reena Roy), a dancer and he informs his parents by telegram that he has chosen a girl. Deepak promises to pay off the debts owed by Jyoti's father. But when Deepak reaches his home in Bombay, he finds that Ramesh has committed suicide due to bankruptcy. Ramesh expresses his last wish that his second wife and her daughter be taken care of. Deepak is delayed in Bombay and is unable to return to Kashmir.

In Kashmir, Jyoti's creditor Hukamchand (Roopesh Kumar) asks her father for money, but Jyoti expresses her inability to pay, so Hukamchand warns Jyoti's father, she will be in grave trouble. When Deepak does arrive at Jyoti's house, her father lies, saying that he has married her off to Hukamchand. Deepak is heartbroken and returns home.

Badri Prasad (Madan Puri), a rich man and childhood friend of Ramesh, bails Deepak out from bankruptcy and gets Ramesh's creditors to not to file suit against Deepak and to auction the bungalow that he would buy. Deepak feels indebted to Badri Prasad. Badri Prasad had been forcing his friend Ramesh Chander to ask Deepak to marry Asha, daughter of Badri Prasad. After Deepak returns to Bombay, his mother suggests to him that he should now get settled in his life and bring some happiness in his life and so he marries Asha. During the wedding, Deepak observes a woman similar to Jyoti. Deepak searches for the Jyoti's lookalike and finds the woman was actually Jyoti.

Now Deepak knows that Jyoti was not married to Hukamchand and that her father had lied to him. Jyoti had come to Bombay in search of Deepak and tells him that she is the mother of Deepak's child. Deepak decides to end his marriage with Asha and to tell Asha the truth, but Jyoti insists that Asha would not be able to remarry as society might discard her. Jyoti asks Deepak to act as if they had never met and be a loyal husband of Asha, so that Jyoti can take care of Deepak's child.

Later, Jyoti becomes a popular dance teacher in her city. Asha decides to learn dancing from Jyoti and they become close friends. Asha discloses that her husband is not loving her and he does not even come close to her. Jyoti visits Asha's home and learns that Asha is none other than Deepak's wife. Jyoti tells Deepak to be a true husband to Asha and give Asha the pleasures of married life.

Asha learns that Jyoti and Deepak were lovers before her marriage to Deepak and suspects they are having an affair. Asha found that Deepak and Jyoti are well wishers of Asha, are innocent and victims of the unpredictable nature of fate. After coming to know the truth, Asha and Jyoti decide to sacrifice their respective lives to let the other live a nice happy married life with Deepak.

Cast
Rajesh Khanna as Deepak Chander
Rekha as Asha
Reena Roy as Jyoti
Asrani as Mauji Lal
Roopesh Kumar as Hukamchand
Madan Puri as Badri Prasad
Om Shivpuri as Ramesh Chander

Music
Lyricist: Anjaan

References

External links
 

1984 films
Indian romantic drama films
1980s Hindi-language films
1984 romantic drama films
Films directed by Dasari Narayana Rao
Films scored by Laxmikant–Pyarelal
Hindi remakes of Telugu films